1K  or 1-K may refer to:
Astra 1K satellite
Astra 1KR satellite
1K ZX Chess computer program
Southern Cross Distribution (IATA code)
Sutra (air company) (IATA code)
BMP-1K, see BMP-1
BRM-1K, see BMP-1 variants
HH-1K, see Bell UH-1 Iroquois variants
XMODEM-1K, a model of XMODEM
YMODEM-1K, a model of YMODEM
GSXR 1K, or Suzuki GSX-R1000
Typ 1K, a chassis code of Volkswagen Golf Mk5
SSH 1K (WA), see Washington State Route 509
Premier 1K, a membership level of United Airlines MileagePlus program
1k as one thousand

See also
Kelvin
Kilobyte
K1 (disambiguation)